Ain-Alar Juhanson (born 2 October 1976) is an Estonian triathlete.

He was born in Paide. In 1994 he graduated from Estonian Sports Gymnasium's Otepää branch.

He began his triathlon career in 1991. Since 1996 his coach was Jüri Käen. He is five-times Estonian champion. Since 2002 he focused on longer distances (longer than olympic triathlon). 2005 and 2006 he won the competition Ironman Lanzarote in Spain. He participated on 2008 Ironman World Championship.

Since 2018 he is one of the organizers of the competition Ironman Tallinn.

Awards:
 2018:

References

Living people
1976 births
Estonian male triathletes
Sportspeople from Paide